Coryphodema tristis, the quince borer, sad goat or apple-trunk borer, is a moth of the family Cossidae. It is found in Botswana and South Africa.

The wingspan is about 38 mm.

The larvae bore into the trunk of a wide range of plant, including species from the Combretaceae, Malvaceae, Myoporaceae, Rosaceae, Scorphulariaceae,
Ulmaceae and Vitaceae. Some important hosts include Buddleja madagascariensis, Combretum, Malus and quince species. It has also been found feeding on Eucalyptus nitens.

References

Cossinae
Insects of South Africa
Moths of Africa